Samuel J. Scott (August 26, 1938 – March 5, 2021) was an engineer who was among the first four black engineers at NASA's Langley Research Center in 1962 after graduating from the University of Pittsburgh's aeronautical engineering program and served as Assistant Director for structures at Langley. He later served as the president of The National Technical Association, chief engineer at the Newport News, Virginia Redeployment and Housing Authority, and a senior manager at Newport News Shipbuilding.

NASA 

After graduation, "he was hired sight unseen" by Langley based on his qualifications and Scott remarked in an interview that "one of the guys in the branch said 'I didn't know he was Black'" when he first arrived at Langley. Among others, he worked with Katherine Johnson and Mary Jackson.

Personal life 

He was the last full-time life guard at the historically black, segregated Bay Shore Beach.

He died March 5, 2021, after a sudden illness.

References 

1938 births
2021 deaths
Engineers from Virginia
NASA people
Langley Research Center
University of Pittsburgh alumni
African-American engineers
20th-century African-American people
21st-century African-American people